Xiegang is a town under the direct jurisdiction of the prefecture-level city of Dongguan, Guangdong Province, China.

Administration

Location

Transportation
Provincial Road S357 and Guangzhou-Meizhou-Shantou Railway intersect within the town.

Geography of Dongguan
Towns in Guangdong